Criminal Brigade (French: Brigade criminelle) is a 1947 French thriller film directed by and starring Gilbert Gil. The cast also included Gisèle Préville, Jean Davy and Maurice Teynac. It was made at the Photosonor Studios in Courbevoie on the outskirts of Paris. The film's set were designed by the art director Nordès Bartau.

Synopsis
Enemy agents attempt to gain control of information about a secret defence system. Commissioner Chabrier attempts to stop them before they can pass the information to their embassy.

Cast
 Jean-Louis Allibert as Inspecteur  
 Ellen Bernsen as Myriam  
 Michel Bouquet as Le tueur  
 Raymond Cordy as Mérignac  
 Jean Davy as Commissaire Chabrier  
 Jacques Dufilho as Lucien  
 Gilbert Gil as Michel Perrin  
 Daniel Ivernel as Jean-Jacques  
 Jean-Max as Oudrach  
 Gaëtan Jor as Inspecteur  
 Gisèle Préville as Christine  
 Maurice Teynac as Fred

References

Bibliography 
 Dayna Oscherwitz & MaryEllen Higgins. The A to Z of French Cinema. Scarecrow Press, 2009.

External links 
 

1947 films
1940s thriller films
French thriller films
1940s French-language films
French black-and-white films
1940s French films